Mayville is an area west of central Durban, South Africa. It has a post office, a police station and primary schools. It has a significant Indian population, who were targeted by the apartheid Group Areas Act.

References

Suburbs of Durban